Egalicia testacea is a species of beetle in the family Cerambycidae. It was described by Henry Walter Bates in 1866. It was discovered, and primarily lives, in Brazil.

References

Hemilophini
Beetles described in 1866